Peter Wilfred James (1930–2014) was an English botanist and lichenologist. He was a pioneer in the study of lichens as environmental indicators, especially of atmospheric pollution.

Early life and education
Peter W. James grew up in Sutton Coldfield, which was then a rural suburb of Birmingham and his interests in natural history and exploring the countryside were encouraged by his older sister. His father was a headteacher. James attended Bishop Vesey's Grammar School in Warwickshire from 1943 until 1949. He was awarded a state scholarship that supported his university study. He graduated with a First class B.Sc. in botany from the University of Liverpool in 1952 with a minor in zoology (1951). There he enrolled as a Ph.D. student with the intention of studying lichenology, having been inspired after a visit to Bala in North Wales. However his supervisor, S. Burfield, died. At this time very few scientists specialised in the study of lichens. His new supervisor advised James to take up a vacation studentship in London. The result was that James discontinued his PhD and became employed by the Natural History Museum, London. He was called up for 2 years of National Service in 1955 - 1957. He was placed within signals regiments. At one point he was sent to Bavaria, and managed to meet up with the lichenologist Josef Poelt.

Career
In 1955 he was employed by London's Natural History Museum initially as a summer student and then as a lichen specialist. After his National Service James spent his career there and became a deputy Keeper of Botany. During his career he had a central role in the development of lichenology in the UK. He built up the lichen collections to be a major international resource as well as expanding the expertise and collaborations within the museum. He collaborated with Dougal Swinscow, who had a key role in developing lichenology in the UK in the late 1950s. As well as mentoring and collaborating with new lichenologists, he published extensively and was active in forming an academic community. His influence was felt by the lichenologists Oliver Gilbert, David Hawksworth, Mark Seaward, Pat Wolseley and Brian Fox. James was also important in the founding of several scientific organisations and journals about lichenology. James was one of those involved in founding the British Lichen Society and was the first editor of The Lichenologist (1958 - 1977). He was a founder member, acting treasurer and first president of the International Association for Lichenology and co-ordinated its first field meeting in the Austrian Alps in 1971.

James was primarily a field scientist personally surveying many sites in the British Isles and he considered that he had seen over 90% of the lichens found in the British Isles in their natural habitats. He surveyed many areas that were, or became, protected because of their biological inhabitants. Throughout his career he acted as a tutor at Field Studies Council thus training future lichenologists. He also led visits and expeditions in the UK and abroad including to temperate South America as well as Australia, New Zealand, North Greenland and the Atlantic islands. However he also had a very substantial role in the organisation and publication of works about lichen taxonomy. In 1962 James was seconded to the University of Otago, New Zealand for 6 months to curate the specimens collected by James Murray. While there, James also collected more specimens. He made a second visit to New Zealand in 1981. 

Lichenology in the UK was improved by his own and collaborative books about lichen identification, especially his New Checklist of British Lichens (1965) and his contributions to Ursula Duncan's Introduction to British Lichens (1970) and Lichen Flora of Great Britain and Ireland (1992) edited by Ole William Purvis. Although he retired in 1990 he continued to be active in lichenology. He was one of the founders of the charity Plantlife in 1990 and acted as its vice-president and as a trustee for a time.

His interest in the effects of air quality on lichens began in the 1970, particularly after a visit to an aluminium smelter on Anglesey. He was involved in many field surveys as well as publishing and providing training about  lichens and air quality.

James was the author or co-author of several scientific publications that made significant advances to the knowledge of lichen morphology, taxonomy and community ecology. These included on the nature of cephalodia, the genus of foliose lichens Nephroma and the first overview of lichen communities in the British Isles.

Personal life
James was also a collector of UK stamps, specialising in those from the Edwardian period to King George V and of cacti. He retired in 1990 and died in 2014. He was never married.

Selected publications
James was the author or co-author of scientific publications including:
 
 
 
 
  (over 175 citations)
 
  (over 60 citations)
  (over 250 citations)
 
 
 
 
 
 
 
 
 
 
 
  (over 75 citations)
  (over 1790 citations)
  (over 125 citations)
 
  (over 160 citations)

Awards and Honours
Several general and species have been named after James. These include the genus Japewia (James, Peter Wilfrid) in 1990, Jamesiella in 2005 and Peterjamesia in 2006 for his 75th birthday.

See also
:Category:Taxa named by Peter Wilfred James

References

External links
 

1930 births
2014 deaths
20th-century British botanists
21st-century British botanists
British lichenologists
People associated with the Natural History Museum, London
People educated at Bishop Vesey's Grammar School
Alumni of the University of Liverpool
People from Sutton Coldfield
Acharius Medal recipients